The 51st Pennsylvania House of Representatives District is located in southern Pennsylvania and has been represented by Charity Grimm Krupa since 2023.

District profile
The 51st Pennsylvania House of Representatives District is located in Fayette County and includes the following areas:

 Fairchance
 Georges Township
 German Township
 Henry Clay Township
 Markleysburg
Masontown
Menallen Township
 Nicholson Township
North Union Township
 Point Marion
 Smithfield
 South Union Township
 Springhill Township
 Uniontown
 Wharton Township

Representatives

Recent election results

References

Government of Fayette County, Pennsylvania
Government of Somerset County, Pennsylvania
51